KGNZ is an FM Christian radio station that serves the Abilene, Texas, San Angelo, Texas, and Lubbock, Texas regional areas. The non-commercial station is under ownership of Christian Broadcasting Co., Inc., a 501.c.3 non-profit organization.

KGNZ is available via 24-hour web streams at KGNZ.com, on TuneIn radio, iTunes Radio, and free applications for Apple and Android devices.

History

Programming
KGNZ currently presents the most daily local programming of any station of any format in the markets it serves. Local, generally live on-air hosts man the station from 7am until midnight weekdays and from 9am until 6pm on Saturdays. The general format is Christian Adult Contemporary, but features a variety of special programming. Weekdays at noon, new and old favorite worship songs are presented during The Praise Hour. The Classic Half-Hour with Ron Rosseau airs weekdays at 1pm and features CCM classics dating back to the origins of the genre. Many of these tracks originally aired on the station as vinyl records. On July 3, 2017, KGNZ expanded its nighttime offerings, becoming the only religious or secular radio station in the market to offer local programming every weeknight until midnight. The station tapped AISD Shotwell Stadium PA announcer and KGNZ Sunday Morning Living Praise announcer Mike Coffey to take the reins of KGNZ In the Evenings, extending that show an hour until 9pm. 
KGNZ maintains an active community presence with its free "Community Events Calendar," a service which promotes events for local non-profits and churches both on its website and via hourly on-air announcement at 45 minutes past the hour. KGNZ is the exclusive radio partner for Fields of Faith Abilene, held each September at Shotwell Stadium, and One Kingdom Ministry's "Exalt" Community-wide Worship Service, held each January. The station provides broadcast carriage of each event live in its entirety.

During daylight hours Monday through Saturday, the station rebroadcasts Salem Media Group's SRN News at the top of each hour. On weekdays, KGNZ receives recorded weather updates from degreed meteorologists at media partner KTXS-TV which are broadcast during the morning and afternoon drive windows. The station may cut to these meteorologists' live audio feed during breaking severe weather coverage when life-threatening weather enters the city of Abilene.

KGNZ presents a variety of syndicated talk programming of interest to its listeners including Focus on the Family and the family radio drama Adventures in Odyssey. Current air times of these programs are listed below.

Stations
One full-power station is licensed to simulcast the programming of KGNZ:

Translators
KGNZ programming is currently broadcast on the following translators:

Technical Information
The station's studios feature the latest AoIP (Audio over IP technology using a Wheatstone digital studio featuring twin Wheatstone L-12 digital consoles and an assortment of BLADE interfaces. All studio audio is transported exclusively in digital formats whenever possible. Other equipment includes Neumann TLM-103 microphones, Simian automation, Tieline IP links which allow remote broadcast return to the station at full 192k studio quality audio, Telos One analog phone hybrids, and Inovonics David IV master processing. The link to KLTP and translator sites is by dedicated and encrypted satellite uplink.

In fall 2017, the station installed a new Nautel GV20 digital transmitter at its main tower site. The station will soon retire the nearly 30-year old Continental Electronics 816R tube transmitter it bought new to stand-by usage. The Nautel unit will enable station upgrades in the future to an all-digital signal path to the transmitter point, and later, transmission in HD Radio. As of September 1, 2019, the station was still operating full-time on the old transmitter.

External links
KGNZ official website

GNZ
GNZ
Radio stations established in 1971